The 2013 SMU Mustangs football team represented Southern Methodist University in the 2013 NCAA Division I FBS football season. The Mustangs, led by sixth-year head coach June Jones, played their home games at Gerald J. Ford Stadium in University Park, Texas, an enclave of Dallas. This was the first year as a member of the American Athletic Conference after having previously played in Conference USA. They finished the season 5–7, 4–4 in American Athletic play to finish in fifth place.

Schedule

Game summaries

Texas Tech

This game was the 49th meeting of the SMU Mustangs and the Texas Tech Red Raiders. The most recent match-up was September 5, 2010, a game in which Texas Tech defeated SMU with a final score of 41–23. After this game, Texas Tech leads the series 33–16.

Montana State

This game was the first meeting between the Mustangs and Bobcats. SMU leads the series 1–0–0.

Texas A&M

This game was the 80th meeting of the SMU Mustangs and the Texas A&M Aggies. The most recent match-up was September 15, 2012, a game in which Texas A&M defeated SMU with a final score of 48–3. After this match-up, Texas A&M leads the series 44–29–7.

TCU

This game was the 91st meeting of the SMU Mustangs and the TCU Horned Frogs. Before this game, the most recent match-up was September 29, 2012, a game in which TCU defeated SMU with a final score of 24–16. Heading into the 2013 matchup, TCU led the series 44–40–7. SMU and TCU share an intense crosstown rivalry which is commonly referred to as the Battle for the Iron Skillet.

Rutgers

This game was the 1st meeting of the SMU Mustangs and the Rutgers Scarlet Knights. After Rutgers' victory in triple overtime, they led the series 1–0.

Memphis

This game was the 6th meeting of the SMU Mustangs and the Memphis Tigers. The most recent match-up was October 27, 2012, a game in which SMU defeated Memphis with a final score of 44–13. After SMU's 34–29 victory, the series stands tied at 3–3.

Temple

This game will be the 3rd meeting of the SMU Mustangs and the Temple Owls. The most recent match-up was September 30, 1946, a game in which SMU and Temple ended with a 7–7 draw. In fact, both previous meetings have ended in ties, so heading into the 2013 matchup, the series stands at 0–0–2. After SMU's victory, they took a 1-0-2 lead in the series.

Cincinnati

This game was the 1st meeting of the SMU Mustangs and the Cincinnati Bearcats. After Cincinnati's win, they led the series 1-0.

UConn

This game will be the 2nd meeting of the SMU Mustangs and the UConn Huskies. The only previous match-up was September 16, 1989, an infamous game for SMU as it was their first win after coming back from the Death Penalty sanctions in 1987 and 1988 in which SMU defeated UConn with a final score of 31–30 after coming back from a 14–30 deficit late in the 4th quarter. After SMU's 2013 victory, SMU leads the series 2–0.

South Florida

This game was the 1st meeting of the SMU Mustangs and the South Florida Bulls. After SMU's victory, they led the series 1-0.

Houston

This game will be the 29th meeting of the SMU Mustangs and the Houston Cougars. The most recent match-up was October 18, 2012, a game in which SMU defeated Houston with a final score of 72–42. Heading into the 2013 matchup Houston leads the series 17–10–1.

UCF

This game will be the 6th meeting of the SMU Mustangs and the UCF Knights. The most recent match-up was November 3, 2012, a game in which UCF defeated SMU with a final score of 42–17. Heading into the 2013 match-up UCF leads the all-time series 4–1.

References

SMU
SMU Mustangs football seasons
SMU Mustangs football